The Prosecution of Offences Act 1879 was a United Kingdom Act of Parliament passed in 1879. It established the role of Director of Public Prosecutions at a maximum annual salary of £2000, reporting to the Attorney General, with up to six assistants. Both Director and assistants had to be barristers or solicitors of the Supreme Court of Judicature with a minimum of ten (Director) or seven (assistants) years' experience, but were not allowed to practice outside their roles as assistants or Director.

The Director's role was to "institute, undertake, or carry on ... similar [criminal] proceedings" at Crown Courts and before magistrates, Justices of the Peace and sessions of oyer and terminer, as well as advising those involved in such proceedings, such as court clerks and head police officers. It also provided for the Director to force a prosecution if others failed or refused to do so.

References

United Kingdom Acts of Parliament 1879
Prosecution services of the United Kingdom